{{DISPLAYTITLE:C18H20FN3O4}}
The molecular formula C18H20FN3O4 (molar mass: 361.368 g/mol, exact mass: 361.1438 u) may refer to:

 Levofloxacin
 Ofloxacin

Molecular formulas